James Duport (1606, Cambridge17 July 1679, Peterborough) was an English classical scholar.

Life

His father, John Duport, who was descended from an old Norman family (the Du Ports of Caen, who settled in Leicestershire during the reign of Henry IV), was master of Jesus College, Cambridge. The son was educated at Westminster School and at Trinity College, where he became fellow and subsequently vicemaster. In 1639 he was appointed Regius Professor of Greek, in 1641 Archdeacon of Stow, in 1664 Dean of Peterborough, and in 1668 Master of Magdalene College.

Works

Through the Civil War, in spite of the loss of his clerical offices and eventually of his professorship, Duport continued his lectures. He is best known by his Homeri gnomologia (1660), a collection of all the aphorisms, maxims, and remarkable opinions in the Iliad and Odyssey, illustrated by quotations from the Bible and classical literature. His other published works chiefly consist of translations (from the Bible and Prayer Book into Greek) and short original poems, collected under the title of Horae subsecivae or Stromata. They include congratulatory odes (inscribed to the king); funeral odes; carmina comitialia (tripos verses on different theses maintained in the schools, remarkable for their philosophical and metaphysical knowledge); sacred epigrams; and three books of miscellaneous poems (Sylvae). The character of Duports' work is not such as to appeal to modern scholars, but he deserves the credit of having done much to keep alive the study of classical literature in his day.

Notes

References
J. H. Monk's Memoir (1825);
John Edwin Sandys, (Hist. Class. Schol. (1908), ii.349).
Rosemary O'Day, ‘Duport, James (1606–1679)’, Oxford Dictionary of National Biography, Oxford University Press, Sept 2004; online edn, Jan 2008, accessed 7 Sept 2008

1606 births
1679 deaths
Fellows of Magdalene College, Cambridge
Alumni of Trinity College, Cambridge
Fellows of Trinity College, Cambridge
Fellows of Jesus College, Cambridge
Deans of Peterborough
Masters of Magdalene College, Cambridge
Vice-Chancellors of the University of Cambridge
English classical scholars
People educated at Westminster School, London
Archdeacons of Stow
English male poets
Regius Professors of Greek (Cambridge)